= Strong and weak sampling =

Strong and weak sampling are two sampling approach in Statistics, and are popular in computational cognitive science and language learning. In strong sampling, it is assumed that the data are intentionally generated as positive examples of a concept, while in weak sampling, it is assumed that the data are generated without any restrictions.

== Formal Definition ==
In strong sampling, we assume observation is randomly sampled from the true hypothesis:

$$P(x|h) = \begin{cases} \frac{1}{|h|} & \text{, if } x \in h \\ 0 & \text{, otherwise} \end{cases}$$

In weak sampling, we assume observations randomly sampled and then classified:

$$P(x|h) = \begin{cases} 1 & \text{, if } x \in h \\ 0 & \text{, otherwise} \end{cases}$$

== Consequence: Posterior computation under Weak Sampling ==
$$P(h|x) = \frac{P(x|h) P(h)}{\sum\limits_{h'} P(x|h') P(h')} = \begin{cases} \frac{P(h)}{\sum\limits_{h': x \in h'} P(h')} & \text{, if } x \in h \\ 0 & \text{, otherwise} \end{cases}$$

Therefore the likelihood $P(x|h')$ for all hypotheses $h'$ will be "ignored".
